Qaleh Now-e Gunesban (also Romanized as Qal‘eh Now-e Gūnsebān; also known as Qal‘eh Now and Qal‘eh Now-ye Parī) is a village in Kamazan-e Sofla Rural District, Zand District, Malayer County, Hamadan Province, Iran. At the 2006 census, its population was 300, in 71 families.

References 

Populated places in Malayer County